Indeno[1,2,3-cd]pyrene is a polycyclic aromatic hydrocarbon (PAH), one of 16 PAHs generally measured in studies of environmental exposure and air pollution. Many compounds of this class are formed when burning coal, oil, gas, wood, household waste and tobacco, and can bind to or form small particles in the air. The compounds are known to have toxic, mutagenic and/or carcinogenic properties. Over 100 different PAHs have been identified in environmental samples. One of these 16 is Indeno[1,2,3-cd]pyrene (IP). IP is the combination of an indeno molecule and a pyrene molecule with a fluoranthene network. In 1962, the National Cancer Institute reported that indeno[1,2,3-cd]pyrene has a slight tumor activity. This was confirmed in 1973 by the IARC in mice testing.

Production 

In nature, IP is formed when burning coal, oil, gas, wood, household waste and tobacco. There are various pathways in which nature can produce PAHs, but the most important mechanism to form such compounds is based on hydrogen abstraction-acetylene addition (HACA). This is accepted as the major reaction route to form PAHs in combustion flames.

When producing IP in the lab, there are two efficient synthetic approaches. The first one is by forming a reactive diazonium intermediate out of 2-(pyren-1-yl)aniline. When this intermediate is formed, it can react with a tethered polycyclic aromatic moiety at room temperature. This is done by an intramolecular aromatic substitution. The reactivity of this reaction is controlled by the substrate concentration and its stoichiometry. tBuONO is used as a reagent (figure 1). The second way to synthesize IP is with a one-pot synthesis. With 4-bromopyrene as starting material and by adding Pd3(dba)2, P(Cy)2 and BDU in DMF, the final product will form (figure 2).

Chemical properties

Reactions with electrophiles

Indeno[1,2,3-cd]pyrene can undergo reaction with bromine or fluorine to 12-bromoindeno[1,2,3-cd]pyrene  and 2-fluoroindeno[1,2,3-cd]pyrene  respectively.

Nitration

The reaction with indeno[1,2,3-cd]pyrene can be performed using NHO3 in an acetyl nitrate solution. The reaction yielded IP-NO2 which was regioselective, the nitrate group being added mainly to the 12 position which is the same as the Friedel-Crafts acylation and bromination

Physical properties 

Indeno[1,2,3-cd]pyrene (IP) is classified as a polycyclic aromatic hydrocarbon (PAH) and appears as a yellow crystal. It contains five benzene rings and one cyclopentane, resulting in a planar molecule. There is no stereochemistry present in IP, but there are resonance structures due to benzene’s conjugated pi electrons. They can move freely within the cycling rings, providing stabilization energy.

Ecological effect 

Different studies have been conducted to investigate the ecological effects of several PAHs, including indeno(1,2,3-cd)pyrene. The International Agency for Research on Cancer (IARC) published results claiming that the compound is carcinogenic in several experimental animals. Another research group studied phototoxic effects of the compound and they found these only at very high levels in a cell line of the rainbow trout. Since these levels can never be reached in water for indeno(1,2,3-cd)pyrene, even when it is maximally dissolved, it will not have any implications for aquatic animals. It does not dissolve well because of its lipophilic and thus hydrophobic character. This is beneficial for the environment, as lipophilicity is inversely proportional to ecotoxicity because of this water solubility. Therefore this does not only prevent phototoxicity but also a large part of toxicity in general. Some Swedish researchers have also conducted research into the PAH levels in sewage treatment plants in Sweden. They induced EROD activity, which is a measure for toxicity in chicken embryo livers, by incubating with PAH extracts from the sludge. Indeno(1,2,3-cd)pyrene, which was one of the researched PAHs in this paper, contributed together with 5 other selected PAHs to only a minor part of the EROD activity. Therefore, the indeno(1,2,3-cd)pyrene levels did induce some toxicity in the chicken embryo liver, but just a slight amount at its own in all probability.

Mechanism 

Indeno(1,2,3-cd)pyrene are among other PAHs considered as possible carcinogens to humans. The PAH family consists of similar molecules and therefore they have a similar mechanism of causing cancer in vivo. The molecule is metabolized in the body by the cytochrome P450 system, resulting in metabolites containing nitro, quinone or hydroxyl groups. This was in line with metabolites formed from other PAHs. The nitro and quinone containing compound turned out to be cytotoxic or carcinogenic, while the hydroxyl containing metabolite did not show any toxicity or carcinogenicity. PAHs including indeno(1,2,3-cd)pyrene may be genotoxic. When PAHs are hydrolyzed, very reactive epoxide groups can be created at certain regions in the molecule where the molecule is extra reactive compared to the rest. These groups can ultimately form an adduct with the base of a nucleotide in the DNA. DNA adducts with PAHs can disrupt the DNA replication or modify the DNA, by removing bases like adenine and guanine from the nucleotides. This can in the end lead to cell death and the production of truncated or misfolded proteins.

References 

Polycyclic aromatic hydrocarbons
Hexacyclic compounds